is a voice talent management firm in Japan.

Members

Female

Hikaru Akao
Saori Hayami
Hiromi Hirata
Kaede Hondo
Momoko Ishikawa
Rie Kugimiya
Rin Kusumi
Natsuko Kuwatani
MAKO
Ayano Matsumoto
Maria Naganawa
Mai Nakahara
Mayako Nigo
Miho Okasaki
Saori Ōnishi
Ari Ozawa
Chiwa Saitō
Tomo Sakurai (in cooperation with "Asakura Kaoru Engekidan")
Yū Sasahara
Sayaka Senbongi
Yumi Shimura
Aya Suzaki
Larissa Tago Takeda
Mikako Takahashi
Mutsumi Tamura
Yuiko Tatsumi
Hiromi Tsunakake
Maaya Uchida
Kana Ueda
Naomi Wakabayashi
Sayuri Yahagi
Akane Yamaguchi
Maria Yamamoto
Mayumi Yoshida
Haruka Yoshimura
Yōko Hikasa

Male
Kōhei Amasaki
Junji Majima
Yoshitsugu Matsuoka
Takeo Ōtsuka
Gen Satō
Hiro Shimono
Tatsuhisa Suzuki
Motoki Takagi

External links
 I'm Enterprise

References 

Japanese voice actor management companies